Anbarak (also Romanized as Ānbāraḵ; also known as Ānbārī) is a village in Senderk Rural District, Senderk District, Minab County, Hormozgan Province, Iran. At the 2006 census, its population was 49, in 11 families.

References 

Populated places in Minab County